Plack may refer to:

 Plack (coin), an ancient Scottish coin
 Plack (software), a set of tools for running Perl-based Web applications and frameworks
 Plack (horse)

People with the surname
Adam Plack, Australian musician, composer and producer

See also
 
 
 Plackart, medieval armor
 Plac (disambiguation)
 Placard, notice/poster/sign
 Plaque (disambiguation)